The Basque Nationalist Party (EAJ ; , PNV; , PNB; EAJ-PNV), officially Basque National Party in English, is a Basque nationalist and regionalist political party. The party is Christian-democratic, with social-democratic and conservative-liberal factions. It operates in all the territories comprising the Basque Country: the Basque Autonomous Community and Navarre in Spain, and in the French Basque Country. It also has delegations in dozens of foreign nations, specifically those with a major presence of Basque immigrants.

The EAJ-PNV was founded by Sabino Arana in 1895, which makes it the second oldest extant political party in Spain, after the Spanish Socialist Workers' Party. The EAJ-PNV is the largest Basque nationalist party, having led the Basque Government uninterruptedly since 1979, except for a brief period between 2009 and 2012. In Navarre, it is part of the coalition Geroa Bai, which is currently the party in the Navarrese regional government. Currently a member of the European Democratic Party, EAJ-PNV was previously a member of the European Free Alliance from 1999 to 2004. Earlier it had been affiliated with the European People's Party and the Christian Democrat International (from which it was expelled in 2000).

The current chairman of the EAJ-PNV is Andoni Ortuzar. The party's youth wing is Euzko Gaztedi. The EAJ-PNV's social offices are called batzokis, of which there are over 200 throughout the world. Since 1932, the party celebrates Aberri Eguna (Homeland Day) on Easter. Also, since 1977, it celebrates Alderdi Eguna (Party Day).

History

Origins and early history 

The Basque Nationalist Party (EAJ-PNV) was founded in 1895 by Sabino de Arana Goiri as a Catholic and conservative political party agitating for political independence for the province of Biscay and the defence of Basque traditional culture, language, and racial purity. In fact, in its early years, party membership was restricted to those who could prove pure Basque ancestry by having eight Basque surnames.

By 1897, the party sought independence not only for Biscay but for all seven provinces comprising the Basque Country in both Spain and France.

In 1916, the Basque Nationalist Party renamed itself the Basque Nationalist Communion (Comunión Nacionalista Vasca). This name change marked a departure, in many aspects, from the original doctrine of the late Sabino Arana and casting itself as a broader social movement rather than simply a political party. The Basque Nationalist Communion at this point advocated for Basque autonomy within Spain, rather than outright independence. However, a small faction known as the "Aberrianos" ("Fatherlanders") within the party remained committed to the cause of independence. In 1921, the leading members of the Aberrianos were kicked from the moderate Basque Nationalist Communion. Later that year, the Aberrianos officially formed their own political party, reclaiming the name "Basque Nationalist Party".

During the single party dictatorship of Captain General Miguel Primo de Rivera (1923-1930), the Basque Nationalist Party was outlawed, and its members went underground. Many of its activities continued through mountaineering ("mendigoxale") and folklore associations. However, the Basque Nationalist Communion was tolerated by the Spanish dictatorship as it was considered a moderate regionalist party.

At the end of 1930, the two nationalist organisations united under the original name Basque Nationalist Party. However, a small faction split from the Basque Nationalist Communion shortly before the reunification, calling itself Eusko Abertzale Ekintza-Acción Nacionalista Vasca ("Basque Nationalist Action"). It was on the moderate nationalist left, non-confessional and open to alliances with Spanish republican and socialist parties.

The Second Spanish Republic

1934–1935 
The division between autonomism and independentism appeared again during the Second Spanish Republic. Headed by Aberriano veteran Eli Gallastegi, a small group of independentists coalesced around the Mountaineering Federation of Biscay and its affiliated weekly publication Jagi-Jagi ("Arise Arise"), and abandoned the now-moderate and autonomist Basque Nationalist Party.

The Spanish Civil War and Franco's rule

Civil War
After the Spanish Civil War of 18 July 1936, the party felt torn. Certain branches of the party supported the rebellion against the Republic, feeling sympathy for its Catholic and anti-Communist agenda. However, the right-wing rebels insisted on a unified Spain, making them hostile to nationalist movements in regions such as the Basque Country. Furthermore, the Basque Nationalist Party was also anti-Fascist, while Fascists constituted a large part of the rebellion. Ultimately, the republican government was able to secure the allegiance of the Basque Nationalist Party with the promise to pass a Basque Autonomy Statute.

The Biscayan and Gipuzkoan branches declared support for the republic, democracy, and anti-fascism in the ensuing Spanish Civil War and were key in balancing those provinces to the Republican side. In the territory seized by the rebels, PNV members faced tough times. During the military uprising in Navarre, the Basque nationalist mayor of Estella-Lizarra, Fortunato Aguirre, was arrested by the Spanish nationalist rebels (18 July 1936), and killed in September. Some Basque nationalists could flee north to Basque areas loyal to the Republic, or France. However, some members of the Alavese and Navarrese committees, ahead of an official decision, published notes refusing support to the Republic. Notwithstanding their initial ambiguous position in certain areas, the party premises and press in Álava and Navarre were closed in that month of July.

Some PNV sympathizers and members joined the Carlist battalions, either out of conviction or to avoid persecution. By October 1936, a war front had been established at the northern tip of Álava and to the west of Donostia-San Sebastián. Initially, the Defence Committees in Biscay and Gipuzkoa were dominated by the Popular Front. After hard negotiations, eventually Basque autonomy was granted within the Second Spanish Republic in late 1936, and the new autonomous government immediately organized the Basque Army, consisting of militias recruited separately by the various political organizations, including the EAJ-PNV, EAE-ANV, and Jagi-Jagi.

The autonomous government maintained remarkable order behind the lines in Biscay and western Gipuzkoa, and managed the coordination and provision of military resistance. Upon occupation of territories loyal to the Republic, the rebel forces focused repression on leftists, but Basque nationalists were also targeted, facing prison, humiliation, and death in some cases. As the rebel troops approached Biscay, the Carlist press in Pamplona even called for the extermination of Basque nationalists.
 
José Antonio Aguirre, the party leader, became in October 1936 the first lehendakari (Basque president) of the wartime multipartite Basque Government, ruling the unconquered parts of Biscay and Gipuzkoa. In April 1937, the city of Gernika was bombed by German airplanes covertly aiding the rebel forces. Jose Antonio Aguirre stated that "the German planes bombed us with a brutality that had never been seen before for two and a half hours." Pablo Picasso made a painting in remembrance of the massacre named after the city that year.

When Bilbao, the most populated city in the Basque Country, was taken by Franco's troops, the Basque nationalists decided to not destroy or sabotage the powerful manufacturing industry of Bilbao, thinking that they had the responsibility to secure the prosperity of their people in the future. This decision allowed the occupying rebel forces to use the industrial power of Bilbao in their war effort against the rest of Republic-aligned Spain.

In July 1937, having lost all Basque territory, the Basque Army retreated toward Santander. With no territory or help from the Republic, the Basque Army surrendered to the Italian Corpo Truppe Volontari through the so-called Santoña Agreement. Prison sentences and executions followed, as the rebel government of Francisco Franco ruled that separate terms of surrender could not be made between the Basques and Italians. The Basque government then moved to Barcelona until the fall of Catalonia, and then out of Spain into exile in France. Lehendakari Aguirre was exiled in Belgium when Hitler's forces invaded it, thus beginning his long clandestine journey to reach the United States. With a false identity, he travelled to Berlin, and then on to Sweden with the help of a Panamanian ambassador. He fled Europe for Latin America, where in Uruguay he re-assumed his real identity and was given a visa to the United States. He travelled to New York, where he was taken under the protection of American Basques as a professor at Columbia University.

Exile during the post-war
The president of the Basque Government in exile was always a EAJ-PNV member and even the sole Spanish representative in the United Nations was the Basque appointee Jesús de Galíndez until his murder in an obscure episode regarding his PhD Thesis about Dominican Republic's dictator Trujillo. He also decided to put the large Basque exiles' network at the service of the Allied side and collaborated with the US Secretary of State and the CIA during the Cold War to fight Communism in Spanish America.

When the United States decided to back Franco in 1952 Aguirre went to France anew where the Basque Government in exile was established. Also, he learned there that the pro-Nazi French government of Vichy confiscated the Basque Government's building and that the anti-Nazi Charles de Gaulle maintained it as a Spanish Government's possession, given that the Basque Government has never had any international consideration other than representatives of a region in Spain at most. The building today is the Instituto Cervantes premises where French people can learn any of the Spanish languages, including Basque.

Generational conflict and new alliances
In 1959 ETA was created by young undergraduates from the area of Bilbao (organisation EKIN) lured by Basque nationalist ideology, but increasingly disgruntled at the ineffective political action of the EAJ-PNV, largely daunted by post-war repression and scattered in exile. In addition, the new generation resented an attempt of the EAJ-PNV to pull the strings of their movement and PNV's youth wing Euzko Gaztedi (EGI), with whom they had merged in the mid-50s, as well as showing a more modern stance, stressing for one the language as the centre of Basqueness, instead of race.

In the 1950s and 60s the party looked for alliances abroad, expecting at first that the defeat of the Axis in World War II would encourage USA's support for an eventual overthrow of Franco's hold on power, which didn't happen. In addition, it was a founder party of the Christian Democrat International, but now the party is an active member of the European Democratic Party.

In the late 60s and early 70s, contacts started with other Spanish parties to assert the EAJ-PNV's position in a new post-Francoist order. At the same time, the Basque Nationalist Party confirmed its stance against ETA in a period when its violent actions saw a surge and its influence in society was very apparent, especially in street protests. Juan de Ajuriaguerra paved the way for the EAJ-PNV's comeback to Basque politics from exile, and started to negotiate their participation in the new status-quo, with special attention to a new Statute.

A Basque Statute

The EAJ-PNV's results in the 1977 and 1978 elections confirmed PNV's central position in Basque politics. While the EAJ-PNV advocated for abstention in the referendum on the Spanish Constitution for its lack of Basque input, the party supported the Statute of Autonomy of the Basque Country, approved in December 1978, and paved the way to its success in the first elections held in the Basque Autonomous Community, once Navarre was left out.

In the transition years after Franco's death in 1975, Xabier Arzallus came to prominence, who masterminded the so-called "Spirit of Arriaga" to accommodate the party to the new Spanish democracy. Despite some internal tensions, the former priest and Jesuit came up reinforced and was chosen undisputed party leader. The EAJ-PNV found its main and strongest support base in Biscay, while in Navarre EAJ-PNV was next to non-existent.

Carlos Garaikoetxea spearheaded the new autonomous government after being elected with 38.8% of the votes and during this first term the Basque Nationalist Party held office without outside support. During this period, the EAJ-PNV's challenges were closely associated to its position in the Basque Government: defense of the Statute, devolution of powers from Madrid, discrediting of political violence, restructuring of manufacturing industry steeped in crisis.

As of 1985 tensions inside the party spurred the formation of a splinter group with a stronghold in Gipuzkoa, which in turn led to a new party in 1987, when dissenters from the EAJ-PNV formed the Basque Solidarity ("Eusko Alkartasuna", EA) party. Carlos Garaikoetxea was then elected as the first president of the rival party. The split from the EAJ-PNV was mainly based on:
 A personality clash between the lehendakari Garaikoetxea, who went to form EA, and the EAJ-PNV leader Xabier Arzalluz.
 The configuration of the Basque Country:
 A strong Basque government and weak provinces (EA).
 Strong provinces (EAJ-PNV).

Afterwards, some ideological differences also came out. EA adopted a social-democratic ideology, while the EAJ-PNV remained more attached to its Christian-democratic ideas. The split was particularly bitter given that it was headed by the lehendakari (premier) himself. Many EAJ-PNV political bars ("meeting place") became  ("meeting house").

Since 1991, as time has eased the bitter split (helped by the fact that both Arzalluz and Garaikoetxea have gone into political retirement), both parties agreed to form an electoral coalition in a number of local elections as a means to maximise the nationalist votes, which eventually led to reunite both candidatures in a joint list again for the regional governments of Navarra and the Basque Autonomous Community in 1998. Thus, EA has participated in several EAJ-PNV-led Basque governments, including the 2006 government of President Juan José Ibarretxe Markuartu. Still, EA decided to run by itself in the municipal elections held in May 2007.

Former president Juan José Ibarretxe spearheaded a call for the reform of the Statute of Autonomy that governs the Basque Country Autonomous Community, through a proposal widely known as the Ibarretxe Plan, passed by the Basque Parliament but not even accepted for discussion by the Spanish Cortes Generales.

In 2009 the EAJ-PNV was expelled from office by an alliance of the Socialist Party of the Basque Country and the People's Party, taking advantage of a distorted parliament representation issued from the outlawing of left-wing Basque nationalists. Until that moment, the EAJ-PNV dominated every administration of the Basque government. In Navarre, the EA and EAJ-PNV formed the coalition Nafarroa Bai—'Yes to Navarre'—along with Aralar and Batzarre, but a split within the coalition led to its revamp as Geroa Bai. In terms of ideology, by November 2016 the Basque Nationalist Party shifted its rhetoric to make the autonomous community of Euskadi the subject of the Basque nation.

Position in recent referendums
The EAJ-PNV called for:
 Abstention in the Referendum for Spanish Constitution in 1978.
 Gave freedom to vote yes or no to permanence of Spain in the NATO in 1986. The Yes won the vote in Spain, but the No was the first choice among the electors of the Basque Country.
 Yes to the European Constitution proposal in the referendum held in Spain on 21 February 2005; and supported the Lisbon Treaty in the Spanish Cortes Generales.

Presidents of the party since 1895 

Note: The National Council of the Basque Nationalist Party (Euzkadi-Buru-Batzar) was created in 1911. Therefore, Sabino Arana and Ángel Zabala were only presidents of the Regional Council of Biscay (Bizkai-Buru-Batzar)
1895–1903 Sabino de Arana y Goiri
1903–1906 Ángel Zabala Ozamiz
1906–1908 Deputation formed by Santiago Alda, Alipio Larrauri, Antonio Arroyo, Vicente Larrinaga and Eduardo Arriaga.
1911?–1916 Luis de Arana y Goiri
1916–1920 Ramón Bikuña
1920–1930 Ignacio Rotaeche (Comunión Nacionalista Vasca)
1922–1930 Luis de Arana y Goiri (Aberri)
1930 Ceferino de Jemein (Aberri)

1931–1932 Ramón Bikuña
1932–1933 Luis de Arana y Goiri
1933–1934 Jesús Doxandabaratz
1934–1935 Isaac López Mendizábal
1935–1951 Doroteo Ciáurriz
1951–1953 Juan Ajuriaguerra
1957–1962 José Aguerre
1975–1977 Ignacio Unceta
1977–1980 Carlos Garaikoetxea
1980–1984 Xabier Arzalluz
1984–1985 Román Sudupe
1985–1986 Jesús Insausti
1986–2004 Xabier Arzalluz
2004–2008 Josu Jon Imaz
2008–2013 Iñigo Urkullu
2013–present Andoni Ortuzar

Party Traditions

Jeltzaletasuna

The "old laws" referred to are the fueros, the traditional laws of the Basque provinces, observed by the kings of Castile, and later Spain, until the Carlist Wars.
Basque nationalism evolved out of Carlism, eventually supplanting it in much of the Basque Country.

Thus  could be rendered in English as "one who is fond of God and the Old Laws (JeL)", or translated simply as "nationalist".

A  (after , "companion") is a member of the party.

Alderdi Eguna
Alderdi Eguna ("Party Day") is the national holiday of the Basque Nationalist Party which is annually celebrated on the last Sunday of September, the Sunday closest to the feast day of Saint Michael, the patron saint of Euskal Herria and of the Basque Nationalist Party.

The central act of this celebration is a political meeting of leading nationalists, but the celebration begins in the morning with a traditional festival in which the different municipal organizations from the party set up stands to sell drinks and their more typical products, all brightened up by traditional music. Dances and traditional sports are also enjoyed. The celebration takes place in an open air arena (currently in Foronda, Álava), and lasts until nightfall.

European representation 
In the European Parliament, the Basque Nationalist Party sits in the Renew Europe group with one MEP.

In the European Committee of the Regions, the Basque Nationalist Party sits in the Renew Europe CoR group with one full and one alternate member for the 2020-2025 mandate.

Electoral performance

Regional parliaments

Basque Parliament

Parliament of Navarre

Cortes Generales

Nationwide

Regional breakdown

European Parliament

See also 
 Basque Republic
 Euzkadi
 History of the Basques (Late Modern Period)
 Luis María Bandrés

Notes

References

Bibliography

External links 

 EAJ-PNV page in English 
 EGI, youth movement of EAJ-PNV 
 Basque Nationalism Museum 
 The cradle of Basque nationalism
 Manifiesto y Organización del Partido Nacionalista Vasco, PNV's internal rules from 1906. As heavy scanned JPEG images of Spanish text. 
 EAJ-PNV Ordizia 

1895 establishments in the Basque Country (autonomous community)
Basque nationalism
Catholic political parties
Christian democratic parties in Europe
Centrist parties in Spain
European Democratic Party
Formerly banned political parties in Spain
Nationalist parties in France
Nationalist parties in Spain
Political parties established in 1895
Political parties in the Basque Country (autonomous community)
Political parties in Navarre
Political parties in Northern Basque Country
Political parties of the Spanish Civil War
Regionalist parties in Spain
Transnational political parties
Organisations based in Bilbao